Harald Riedl (born 18 August 1961) is an Austrian equestrian. He competed in two events at the 2004 Summer Olympics.

References

External links
 

1961 births
Living people
Austrian male equestrians
Olympic equestrians of Austria
Equestrians at the 2004 Summer Olympics
Place of birth missing (living people)